Mbappé is a surname of Cameroonian origin. Notable people with the surname include:
Kylian Mbappé (1998),  Cameroonian-French international footballer
Ethan Mbappé (2006), younger brother of Kylian who has been selected for the French U-16 football team
Samuel Mbappé Léppé (1936–1985), Cameroonian footballer 

Surnames of West African origin
Surnames of Cameroonian origin